NTD may refer to:

Biology and medicine 
N-terminal domain, a region at one end of a protein
Neglected tropical diseases, a group of endemic infectious diseases that primarily affect the poor
Neon tetra disease, a disease affecting tropical aquarium fish
Neural tube defect, a group of medical conditions

Television broadcasters 
NTD (Australian TV station)
New Tang Dynasty Television

Technology 
Network Termination Device, a telecommunications device
Neutron transmutation doping, a method to make semiconductors
Nintendo Technology Development, a subsidiary of Nintendo located in Redmond, Washington, U.S.
Notice and take down, removal by Internet hosts of allegedly illegal material

Other uses 
National Theatre of the Deaf, a touring theatre company in the United States
New Era for Democracy, a political party in Burkina Faso
New Taiwan dollar, the currency of Taiwan